Portuairk is a crofting township, at the western end of the Ardnamurchan peninsula, Lochaber, Highland, Scotland.

It is the most westerly settlement on the British mainland, although nearby Kilchoan is the most westerly village.

Overlooking Sanna Bay, the village is visited by walkers and scenery enthusiasts, with views of Skye and the Small Isles: Rùm, Eigg, and Muck.

Cuillin View is a traditional cottage at the end of the bay roughly 172 years old.

Climate
Like much of the British isles, Portuairk has an oceanic climate, with mild, somewhat dry summers and cold, wet winters.

Notes

External links

Populated places in Lochaber
Ardnamurchan